BlueDragon is a ColdFusion Markup Language (CFML) engine comparable to Adobe Systems's ColdFusion. It is licensed and distributed by New Atlanta from TagServlet Ltd based in Scotland.  BlueDragon is also distributed and supported by BEA Systems on their Oracle WebLogic Server server platform.

BlueDragon applications run on a variety of platforms, including Microsoft Windows, Linux, and Mac OS X. It is mostly compatible with ColdFusion MX 7.

In March, 2008 New Atlanta announced that the future versions of BlueDragon (Java EE editions) would be released as open source products. The open source version was released as Open BlueDragon (OpenBD) in December 2008.

Editions 

BlueDragon is available in six editions:
 BlueDragon Server
 BlueDragon Server JX (similar to ColdFusion standalone editions)
 BlueDragon for J2EE Application Servers (BD J2EE)
 BlueDragon for the Microsoft .NET Framework (BD .NET)
 BlueDragon, BEA WebLogic Edition (sold by BEA as a BEA product)
 Open BlueDragon, an open source version of BlueDragon for J2EE.

The first two editions are standalone servers which run on Windows, Linux, and OS X. With BD J2EE, CFML applications can be deployed on any J2EE server, enabling integration of CFML and J2EE as enabled in ColdFusion MX. BD, BEA WebLogic Edition, is a special edition based on BD J2EE for use with BEA's WebLogic Server. BD.NET extends the Microsoft .NET framework and IIS to permit deployment of CFML applications as native MS .NET web applications, offering integration between CFML and ASP.NET that is not possible with ColdFusion.

The Server JX, J2EE, MS .NET, and BEA WebLogic editions of BlueDragon are commercial products which are available as 30-day unlimited trials which convert to a single-IP developer edition with no expiration.

The Server edition, on the other hand, is free for deployment—though not for hosting, redeployment, or (as of the 6.2 release) commercial use.  There are no differences in CFML tags supported in the free Server edition, but it supports only ODBC drivers on MS Windows (and only MySQL or PostgreSQL on Linux and Mac OS X), it supports only IIS on MS Windows or Apache on Linux or Mac OS X, and does not support secured (SSL) connections.

None of the limitations of the free Server edition exist in the commercial Server JX, J2EE, .NET, or BEA WebLogic editions.

The .NET edition of BlueDragon runs on Microsoft's .NET platform, BD.NET enables CFML applications to leverage the .NET platform and allows for integration between CFML and ASP.NET as well as .NET objects.

Open BlueDragon is an open source version of BlueDragon is released under the GNU General Public License version 3 (GPLv3). The chief differences between the open source and the J2EE version are the removal of commercial libraries (e.g., for PDF generation), The JTurbo JDBC driver for Microsoft SQL Server, and the BlueDragon Administrator application. It runs on any standard J2EE application server, such as Tomcat, JBoss or Jetty.

The original version of BlueDragon was released in 2002.

Corporate adoption 
MySpace used the .NET version of BlueDragon to power some of its online applications as of 2007.

Compatibility 
Though BlueDragon 7.0 was designed to be compatible with Adobe ColdFusion MX 7.0.2, there are differences in the two CFML implementations.  BlueDragon offers several advantages (tags, functions, and other functionality) not found in ColdFusion. Similarly, there are a few tags and functions found in ColdFusion that are not supported currently in BlueDragon. New Atlanta maintains a complete list of incompatibilities with Adobe ColdFusion MX in the documentation.

Framework compatibility 
A number of popular ColdFusion frameworks are fully supported on BlueDragon:
 ColdSpring
 Fusebox
 Model-Glue
 Mach-II

References

External links

CFML compilers
CFML programming language